Napoleon & Josephine (Sun City Girls Singles Volume 2) is a compilation album by American experimental rock band Sun City Girls, released on April 14, 2009 by Abduction Records. It comprises tracks previously released as singles and on various artists compilation albums.

Track listing

Personnel
Adapted from the Napoleon & Josephine (Sun City Girls Singles Volume 2) liner notes.

Sun City Girls
 Alan Bishop – bass guitar, acoustic guitar, flute, percussion, effects, vocals
 Richard Bishop – electric guitar, acoustic guitar, piano, organ, flute, vocals
 Charles Gocher – drums, percussion, flute, effects, vocals

Production and additional personnel
 Wm. Berger – recording (10)
 Scott Colburn – mastering, mixing (5, 7-9, 11, 12), recording (7, 9)
 Kevin Crosslin – recording (8)
 Eric Lanzillotta – design
 David Oliphant – recording (13), mixing (13), effects (13)
 Wade Olson – recording (2, 3)
 Sun City Girls – recording (1, 4-6, 11, 12)

Release history

References 

2009 compilation albums
Sun City Girls albums